James Sinton Sleator  (27 June 1885 – 9 January 1950), was an Irish artist, born in Portadown, County Armagh, Ireland.

Painter of portraits and still life, James Sleator was son of William Slator (different spelling, as James changed this, along with his middle name from Samuel to Sinton), who taught at Derryvane National School, near Portadown, and was later principal of Strandtown National School, Belfast. 
The son studied at Belfast School of Art and in 1910 secured a scholarship for study at the Metropolitan School of Art, Dublin, where he was under Sir William Orpen (1878–1931) and won several prizes.  Continuing his studies at the Slade School of Art, London, from there he went to Paris.  He returned to Dublin in 1915 to become a teacher at the metropolitan.  He was elected an Associate of the Royal Hibernian Academy in 1917, and he became a member in the same year.  Five years later he went to Florence when he painted portraits and landscapes, finally returning to London where he set up a studio (1927) as a portrait painter and where he was closely associated with William Orpen. Sleator was a member of the Chelsea Arts Club and exhibited at the Royal Academy and with the Royal Society of Portrait Painters.  He taught painting to Winston Churchill, taking over the job from Orpen.  In 1935 he was made an honorary member of the Ulster Arts Club, Belfast.  He kept in touch with his sister Ethel Slator in Belfast and visited her and his friends. He returned from London to Dublin in 1941 and, apart from an occasional journey abroad, remained there until his death (1950).

Works
In the Ulster Museum is a portrait of Forrest Reid.  The Armagh County Museum and the National Gallery of Ireland, Dublin, have self-portraits. In 1951 a memorial exhibition at the Victor Waddington Galleries, Dublin was opened by Ulster playwright, Rutherford Mayne.

References 

Ruth Devine, ‘Sleator, James Samuel (Sinton)’, Dictionary of Irish Biography Sleator, James Samuel (Sinton) | Dictionary of Irish Biography

1880s births
1950 deaths
19th-century Irish painters
20th-century Irish painters
Irish male painters
Alumni of Belfast School of Art
Alumni of the Slade School of Fine Art
People from County Armagh
Members of the Royal Hibernian Academy
19th-century Irish male artists
20th-century Irish male artists